Kari Meredyth Kimmel (born April 16, 1978) is an American singer, songwriter, composer, and producer. She is best known for the theme track It's Not Just Make Believe for Ella Enchanted, the theme track Black for The Walking Dead trailer, her Cruel Summer cover for Cobra Kai, and the theme track Where You Belong for The Fosters. Her music ranges across the genres of pop, rock and folk.

Early life and education 
Kimmel was born and raised in Boca Raton, Florida. Shortly after graduating high school, she relocated to Los Angeles to pursue a career in music.

She has cited Carole King as her biggest musical inspiration. She has also said that she draws inspiration from Bonnie Raitt, Elton John, and Sheryl Crow.

Career 
Kimmel's career began when she was cast to sing the theme song It's Not Just Make Believe for the 2004 Disney live-action film Ella Enchanted. She also appeared in the music video, which featured on Radio Disney. Kimmel then connected with Randy Spendlove, the president of motion picture music at Miramax at the time, with whom she went on to collaborate on over 20 film projects.

Kimmel has written, arranged, produced, and performed music which has been licensed in over 650 studio films, network television series, trailers, video games, and commercials. Notable productions include the films Blockers, World War Z, Southpaw, and The Duff, the television shows America's Funniest Home Videos, The Office, New Girl, Pretty Little Liars, The Lying Game and Grimm, in addition to the Walking Dead trailer. Her music has also been used in advertisements for Google and Nissan, and the popular video game The Sims. Her track Let's Light It Up was used by WWE wrestler AJ Lee as her entrance theme.

Kimmel has composed 25 theme songs for multiple television series, including Where You Belong for family drama series The Fosters, "Riding Free" for Dreamworks series Spirit Riding Free, "Warriors" for Dreamworks series She-Ra, and the theme song for Disney Junior's Eureka!. She has also performed tracks in the films Pitch Perfect, Pitch Perfect 2, Dreamgirls, Danny Collins, Descendants, Descendants 2, Teen Beach Movie, Teen Beach Movie 2, and Footloose. Her music video for the track Low was used to promote the television series Private Practice and her music video for the track Trouble aired on Oxygen and KNBC. She has performed live on The Adam Corolla Show, The Danny Bonaduce Show, The Conway & Whitman Show, KNBC, and Fox Sports West and Prime Ticket and at multiple venues in Los Angeles, including Los Angeles Dodgers games, Los Angeles Lakers games, and the AIDS Walk benefit, hosted by Prince Edward and the Greek Theatre in 2010; she closed the show.

Kimmel has also written songs which have been recorded by notable artists including The Backstreet Boys, Kesha, Joe Jonas, Demi Lovato and Gloria Gaynor. She has also sung background vocals for Ringo Starr, Bruce Springsteen, Alicia Keys, John Legend, Stevie Wonder, John Mayer, Willie Nelson, and Pharrell.

Kimmel has released five solo albums, titled A Life in the Day, Out of Focus, From the Vault, Go, and Black. Her sixth solo album Gold & Glitter was released on May 25, 2018. The title track was featured in the 2018 comedy film Blockers.

In 2015, Kimmel launched her own licensing company Glow Music Group, and now represents over 750 bands in addition to her own music. In 2017, she led a writer's retreat for VocalizeU and ASCAP in Ojai, California. Her cousin is Jon Carin.

Discography

Albums

EPs

Singles 
{| class="wikitable"
!Year
!Title
!Label
!Other Artist(s)
!Notes
|-
| rowspan="3" |2008
|Let It Go/Taking a Ride
|
|
|
|-
|Low
|Tzviah
|
|
|-
|Dance With Joy
|Sara Lee/Amber (Heavenly)
|Matt Meils
|
|-
| rowspan="4" |2011
|Pennies for Adam
|
|
|
|-
|STFU
|
|
|
|-
|Black
|Independent
|
|The Walking Dead trailer track
|-
|Let's Light It Up
| WWE Music Group
|
|WWE wrestler AJ Lee's entrance track
|-
| rowspan="8" |2012
|Fire
|International Family Entertainment
|
|
|-
|Payphone
|
|
|
|-
|These Boots Are Made for Walkin'''
|Independent
|
|
|-
|Fourteen Minutes|
|
|
|-
|BNE (Best Night Ever)|
|
|
|-
|Fix You Up|
|
|
|-
|Perfect Day|
|
|
|-
|Christmastime|
|
|
|-
| rowspan="5" |2013
|Where You Belong|Abc family
|
|The Fosters' theme song
|-
|While You Were Up High|
|
|
|-
|Fingerprints|
|
|
|-
|Shooting Star|Independent
|
|
|-
|Summertime|Rykim Records
|
|
|-
|2014
|Best Day|Independent
|
|
|-
| rowspan="4" |2015
|Everything is Feeling' Right|Independent
|
|
|-
|Everybody Has to Fall|Independent
|
|
|-
|Best Thing|Independent
|
|
|-
|Happy Family|Independent
|
|
|-
| rowspan="3" |2017
|I See Trouble|Freeform
|
|
|-
|Run Run Run|Independent
|
|
|-
|Don't Feel Like Christmas Without You|Independent
|
|
|-
| rowspan='2' |2018
|Voices|
|
|-
|Call Me|
|
|
|}

 Soundtracks 

 Songwriting 

 Awards and nominations 

In 2017 Kimmel was honored, along with over a hundred other individuals, when she was awarded an ASCAP Screen Music Award for co composing The Fosters' theme song Where You Belong''.

References

External links 

 Official Site
 Kari Kimmel on Spotify
 Kari Kimmel on SoundCloud
 

Living people
American women pop singers
American women singer-songwriters
21st-century American composers
American women composers
Record producers from Florida
ASCAP composers and authors
People from Boca Raton, Florida
American women record producers
21st-century American women musicians
1978 births
21st-century women composers
American singer-songwriters